The Qaa massacre took place on June 28 1978, four villages in Baalback were attacked Ras Baalback, Qaa, Fakiha and Jdeide. The New York Times reported that the killings were connected to the killing of thirty-four people, including Tony Franjieh, by several hundred Phalangist militiamen. The report quotes Camille Chamoun as saying that the attack on the four villages was by “non-Lebanese, non-civilians” and that the gunmen entered the villages with lists of names. Phalangist radio reported forty people were kidnapped and twenty-six of them killed. The dead were reported to be members of the Phalagist party and Chamoun’s National Liberal Party.

Background
15 days earlier, Kataeb committed a massacre in Ehden, killing forty people including Tony Frangieh.

References

1978 in Lebanon
June 1978 events in Asia
Massacres in 1978
Massacres of the Lebanese Civil War
Baalbek District
1978 murders in Lebanon
Massacres of Christians in Lebanon